Joshua Proctor Brown Westhead (April 15, 1807–July 8, 1877) was a British politician. He was elected as a Liberal MP for Knaresborough from 1847 to 1852.

Political career
He returned to the Commons as MP for City of York from 1857 to 1865, and again from 1868 until he resigned in 1871 by becoming Steward of the Manor of Northstead.

Marriage and Children
In 1828 he married Betsy Chapell (1807-1888), daughter of George Royle Chapell of Nelson house.
together they had four children.
George Edward Westhead (July 19, 1829-February 8
, 1872)
Adelaide Westhead ( November 1, 1830-January 21, 1885). Married the 29th Baron of Kingsale.
Marcus Westhead (February 7, 1834-1897)
Thomas Westhead (April 7, 1837-July 12, 1861)

References

External links 
 

1807 births
1877 deaths
Liberal Party (UK) MPs for English constituencies
UK MPs 1857–1859
UK MPs 1859–1865
UK MPs 1868–1874